"Missing You" is a song recorded by American group the Black Eyed Peas for their fifth studio album The E.N.D. (2009). The group co-wrote the song alongside Printz Board and Jean Baptiste, with Printz Board and will.i.am handling production. It was released as a promotional single exclusively in France on April 23, 2010, by Polydor Records.

"Missing You" failed to enter the main singles chart in France, peaking at numbers eight and 19 on the airplay and digital charts, respectively. An accompanying music video for the song was released on June 18, 2010, and included footage from the song's live performance at the Staples Center in Los Angeles during The E.N.D. World Tour (2009–2010). The song was also featured on an episode of the CBS television series NCIS.

Critical reception
Talia Kraines from BBC said that the song had "wild basslines and vocal snarling".

Commercial performance
"Missing You" gained heavy airplay in France and Australia. The song peaked at number eight on the official French Airplay and at number 19 on French Digital Singles chart.

Release and promotion
"Missing You" was released as a promotional single exclusively in France on June 7, 2010, by Polydor Records, having impacted the contemporary hit radio in the country on April 23. It was performed live during The E.N.D. World Tour (2009–2010), and the March 30, 2010 performance at the Staples Center in Los Angeles was recorded and released on June 18 via the group's official Dipdive page, as the accompanying music video for the song in France. The song had also been featured on CBS television series NCIS episode "Moonlighting" on April 27.

Track listing
Digital download (Radio Edit)
"Missing You" (Radio Edit) – 4:26

Credits and personnel
Credits adapted from liner notes.
 will.i.am – vocals, songwriting, synths, drum programming
 apl.de.ap – vocals, songwriting
 Fergie – vocals, songwriting
 Taboo – vocals, songwriting
 Printz Board – songwriting, production, keyboard, synths
 Jean Baptiste – songwriting
 George Pajon, Jr. – guitar

Charts

Release history

References

2010 singles
Songs written by will.i.am
Songs written by Fergie (singer)
Black Eyed Peas songs
Torch songs
Songs written by Jean-Baptiste (songwriter)
Songs written by apl.de.ap
Songs written by Taboo (rapper)
2009 songs
Interscope Records singles